The 2021 Forward Madison FC season is the third season in the soccer team's history, where they compete in the third division of American soccer, USL League One.

Club

Roster 

Coaching staff

Front office staff

Transfers

Transfers in

Transfers out

Kits
 Shirt sponsor: Dairyland Insurance
 Sleeve sponsor: Just Coffee Cooperative
 Shirt manufacturer: Hummel

Competitions

Exhibitions

USL League One

Standings

Results summary

Results by round

Match results

Statistics

Appearances and goals

Goalscorers

Clean sheets

Disciplinary record

References

Forward Madison
Forward Madison
Forward Madison
Forward Madison